Rafi is a Local Government Area in Niger State, Nigeria. Its headquarters are in the town of Kagara on the A125 highway. The southern border of the area is the Kaduna River. Towns in the LGA include Tegina, and Pandogari

It has an area of 3,680 km and a population of 181,929 at the 2006 census.

The postal code of the area is 922.

Languages in Rafi
Hausa
Fulah
Ura
Pangu
Kamuku
Ngwe
Kambari
Gwari

References

Local Government Areas in Niger State